This is a list of number-one hit singles in 1978 in New Zealand, starting with the first chart dated, 29 January 1978.

Chart 

Key
 – Single of New Zealand origin

Notes

 Number of number-one singles: 10
 Longest run at number-one: "Rivers of Babylon" by Boney M (14 weeks).
 Stayin' Alive and You're the One That I Want are songs both from soundtracks from two movies starring John Travolta.

References

External links
 The Official NZ Music Chart, RIANZ website

1978 in New Zealand
1978 record charts
1978
1970s in New Zealand music